Harold Sonny Ladoo (4 February 1945 – 17 August 1973) was a Caribbean novelist, who was the author of two books documenting the struggles of living in poverty in the Hindu communities of Trinidad and Tobago. He moved to Canada in 1968 and was mysteriously murdered while on a visit to Trinidad in 1973.

Biography 
Ladoo was born and grew up in an environment much like the world of his novels. He was born in Trinidad into extreme poverty and immigrated to Toronto, Ontario, Canada, with his wife and son in 1968 to study English at the University of Toronto.

It was during this time that he wrote his first and most notable novel, No Pain Like This Body, published in 1972. Described by David Chariandy and "an unusually strong first novel", it is the vivid story of a young boy growing up in a small Caribbean rice-growing community. The book focuses on the day-to-day struggles of a single family through illness, storm, and violence during the August rainy season. The writing is raw and often naïve yet manages to create a visceral experience.

His second book, Yesterdays (posthumously published, 1974), was a much more upbeat book about a young man attempting to launch a Hindu Mission to Canada.

Ladoo's third book was intended to be the last part of a trilogy; however, in 1973, while on a visit home to his Calcutta Settlement, he was mysteriously killed and his body was found on the side of a road in Trinidad.

Bibliography
 No Pain Like This Body (1972), House of Anansi, 2013
 Yesterdays (posthumously published, 1974)

Legacy 

Michael Bucknor and Conrad James described Ladoo's work as being, along with the works of Andrew Salkey, "especially useful" for tracking developments in Caribbean social attitudes towards masculinity and issues of male sexuality during the mid- to late-20th century, a domain which has been neglected by Western scholars until recently. An essay on Indo-Caribbean authors contrasted Ladoo's work with that of Sasenarine Persaud, neither of whom ever had direct experiences with India; Persaud integrated spiritual and aesthetic elements of Indian high culture into his writing, while Ladoo's writing of his colonial environment featured "naturalistic detail, black humour, and the grotesque". Scholar Victor Ramraj described Ladoo as being unique from fellow Indo-Caribbean writers Neil Bissoondath, Rabindranath Maharaj, Ismith Khan, V. S. Naipaul, and Samuel Selvon: Ladoo's use of Creole dialect is a departure from older Caribbean fiction. Naipaul, Jean Rhys, George Lamming, Derek Walcott and others, used the polished language of the coloniser and showed in doing so that they were equal to the British writers who made a name for themselves. Ladoo, on the other hand, shows his confidence by selecting Creole, as if to say, "this is the dialect of the common man, why should I try to gentrify it?" In doing so, he achieves an authenticity that is furthered by the immersion of his characters in the kind of vocabulary and sentence structure that the poverty-stricken people would use.  In addition, his use of onomatopoeia heightens the effect of the sounds of movement in people and nature, and increases the animism that makes the characters even more authentic. Indigenous people all over the world have believed in the almost god-like power of nature. Ladoo amplifies this distinctive belief in the intentionality given to thunder or lightning or reptiles.

The University of Toronto Mississauga campus (formerly Erindale College) offers to students The Harold Sonny Ladoo Book Prize for Creative Writing every year.

References

Further reading
 Dennis Lee, On the Death of Harold Ladoo, San Francisco: Kanchenjunga Press, 1976.
 Clement H. Wyke, "Harold Ladoo's Alternate Worlds: Canada and Carib Island", Canadian Literature 95 (Winter 1982), pp. 39–49.
 Margaret Paul Joseph, Caliban in Exile: The Outsider in Caribbean Fiction. Greenwood Press, 1992.

1945 births
1973 deaths
20th-century Canadian male writers
20th-century Canadian novelists
20th-century male writers
Canadian Hindus
Canadian male novelists
Canadian people of Indian descent
Canadian writers of Asian descent
Trinidad and Tobago emigrants to Canada
Trinidad and Tobago Hindus
Trinidad and Tobago male writers
Trinidad and Tobago novelists
Trinidad and Tobago people of Indian descent